Jess Greenberg (born 20 December 1994) is an English YouTube personality, singer, and acoustic guitarist from London, England.

Biography
Greenberg started performing publicly at an early age. In an interview she recounted her performance of Elvis Presley's "Can't Help Falling in Love With You" at age four while on a trip to St. Tropez to an audience at the Hotel Byblos. "I requested 'Can't help falling in love with you' by Elvis and the performer asked if I'd sing it. I remember being so excited." She later explained the effect that seeing the 2003 Jack Black movie School of Rock had on her musical interests, "I remember that changing my view of music completely. I started listening to AC/DC, Guns N' Roses, Red Hot Chili Peppers … and I realized how much I loved rock music." Greenberg also cites Jimi Hendrix as "one of my biggest inspirations".

Greenberg began posting cover recordings of songs on YouTube in 2010 at age 15. In December 2012, she was selected as the Female Artist of the Month on the Star Central magazine's website. She also won Ryan Seacrest's "Totally Covered Summer" competition in August 2013 for a cover of "Get Lucky" by Daft Punk. Greenberg also drew significant attention for her cover of AC/DC's "Highway to Hell" posted in August 2013.

In 2012, Greenberg stated that as much as she desired "to be a [professional] musician", she intended to study economics at University College London. She then began reading Statistics, Economics and Finance after completing her A-levels.

After getting her degree, she joined Goldman Sachs as a financial analyst. In October 2016 she left the successful hedge fund and joined Winton Capital as an analyst. She worked there until October 2020 and in November 2020, she started as an associate at BlackRock in London, where she still works.

YouTube
, Greenberg's YouTube channel had over a million (1,400,000+) subscribers and her videos had over 175 million views.

In August 2014, Greenberg's cover of "Enter Sandman" by Metallica, was posted by the online version of Sports Illustrated as "the best-looking Metallica cover you'll see today". Then in October 2014, Greenberg was featured on the website for Guitar World magazine for her covers of Led Zeppelin's "Rock and Roll" and "Whole Lotta Love" with "solos and all" in association with the release of the remastered version of their album, Led Zeppelin IV.

Greenberg was featured in a March 2015 story in the magazine Metro UK by Caroline Westbrook. Westbrook commented that Greenberg, then 20, had accumulated over 70 million views on YouTube and was on her way to becoming an "internet star". Westbrook acknowledged that Greenberg had received attention for her physical attractiveness, but said her talent kept her in the spotlight.

See also
 List of YouTube personalities

References

External links
 

1994 births
Living people
Singers from London
English YouTubers
English women guitarists
English guitarists
21st-century British guitarists
21st-century English women singers
21st-century English singers
People educated at the City of London School for Girls
Music YouTubers
21st-century women guitarists